Mount Bell is a  summit in Alberta, Canada.

Description
Mount Bell is set within Banff National Park, in the Bow Range of the Canadian Rockies. The nearest higher neighbor is Bident Mountain,  to the west. Bident Mountain forms the west buttress of Consolation Pass with Mount Bell forming the east buttress. These two peaks rise above the head of Consolation Valley. Precipitation runoff from Mount Bell drains into tributaries of the Bow River. Topographic relief is significant as the north aspect rises over 830 meters (2,723 ft) above Taylor Lake in one kilometer (0.6 mile) and the south aspect rises 1,000 meters (3,281 ft) above Boom Lake in two kilometers (1.2 mile). The peak is visible from the Icefields Parkway to the east.

History

Originally called Mount Bellevue, the name was changed to honor Dr. Frederick Bell (1883–1971), a founding member of the Alpine Club of Canada and club president from 1926 through 1928. The mountain's toponym was officially adopted on April 3, 1952, by the Geographical Names Board of Canada.

The first ascent of the summit was made in 1910 by an Alpine Club of Canada party including Nora Bell, sister of Frederick Bell.

Geology

Like other mountains in Banff Park, Mount Bell is composed of sedimentary rock laid down during the Precambrian to Jurassic periods. Formed in shallow seas, this sedimentary rock was pushed east and over the top of younger rock during the Laramide orogeny.

Climate

Based on the Köppen climate classification, Mount Bell is located in a subarctic climate zone with cold, snowy winters, and mild summers. Winter temperatures can drop below -20 °C with wind chill factors below -30 °C.

See also
Geography of Alberta

Gallery

References

External links
 Mount Bell: Weather forecast
 Parks Canada web site: Banff National Park

Two-thousanders of Alberta
Mountains of Banff National Park
Canadian Rockies
Alberta's Rockies